Raquel Fernandes dos Santos (born 21 March 1991), commonly known as Raquel, is a Brazilian footballer who plays as a forward for Sporting CP in the Portuguese Campeonato Nacional and the Brazil national team. She participated in the 2015 and 2019 FIFA Women's World Cup.

Club career

Raquel joined Ferroviária in 2010. In the 2013 Campeonato Paulista de Futebol Feminino, she scored six goals in her team's 19–0 win over Botucatu.

In January 2016 Raquel joined compatriots Darlene de Souza and Rafaelle Souza in transferring to Chinese Women's Super League club Changchun Zhuoyue.

Raquel played in the Spanish Primera División for Sporting de Huelva between 2018 and 2019.

On 26 July 2019, Raquel signed with Sporting CP in Portugal.

International career

Atlético Mineiro player Raquel represented Brazil's youth team at the inaugural 2008 FIFA U-17 Women's World Cup in New Zealand. She was called up to the senior Brazil national team for the first time in August 2013 after showing impressive form for her club Ferroviária.

In February 2015 Raquel was included in an 18-month residency programme intended to prepare Brazil's national team for the 2015 FIFA Women's World Cup in Canada and the 2016 Rio Olympics. At the World Cup, Raquel appeared in each of Brazil's four matches, scoring in the 1–0 final group game win over Costa Rica. After Brazil's 1–0 second round defeat by Australia, Raquel remained in Canada as part of the Brazilian selection for the 2015 Pan American Games in Toronto.

International goals

References

External links
 
 Raquel Fernandes dos Santos – FIFA World Cup profile
 Raquel Fernandes dos Santos – 2015 Pan American Games profile

1991 births
Living people
People from Contagem
Sportspeople from Minas Gerais
Brazilian women's footballers
Women's association football forwards
Clube Atlético Mineiro players
Associação Ferroviária de Esportes (women) players
Botafogo Futebol Clube (PB) players
Sport Club Corinthians Paulista (women) players
Primera División (women) players
Sporting de Huelva players
Brazil women's international footballers
2015 FIFA Women's World Cup players
Footballers at the 2015 Pan American Games
Pan American Games gold medalists for Brazil
Footballers at the 2016 Summer Olympics
Olympic footballers of Brazil
Brazilian expatriate women's footballers
Brazilian expatriate sportspeople in China
Expatriate women's footballers in China
Brazilian expatriate sportspeople in Spain
Expatriate women's footballers in Spain
Pan American Games medalists in football
2019 FIFA Women's World Cup players
Sporting CP (women's football) players
Changchun Zhuoyue players
Medalists at the 2015 Pan American Games